Elnesvågen is the administrative centre of Hustadvika Municipality in Møre og Romsdal county, Norway.

The area is predominantly an agricultural area; however, there are also several factories including Moxy Engineering (which produces trucks), the Hustadmarmor marble factory (which produces calcium products for European paper producers), and the Tine cheese factory (which is the largest producer of Jarlsberg cheese with exports to the UK, USA, Canada, Germany, and Australia).

Myrbostad Church was built in 1880 in the eastern part of Elnesvågen. A combined association football-athletics stadium was completed in 1997. The best views of Elnesvågen are from the mountains Heiane/Lågheiane and Gjendemsfjellet. Heiane is most easily accessible from Hauglia, the major residential area in Elnesvågen.

References

Villages in Møre og Romsdal
Hustadvika (municipality)